Stade Municipal d'Abidjan is a multi-use stadium in Abidjan, Côte d'Ivoire. It is currently used mostly for football matches and is the home ground of Stade d'Abidjan of the Côte d'Ivoire Premier Division, the Ivorian top division. The stadium has a capacity of 1,100 spectators.

References

External links
 Stadium information

Football venues in Ivory Coast
Sport in Abidjan
Buildings and structures in Abidjan